MOF may refer to:
 Managed Object Format, a textual representation of the Distributed Management Task Force (DMTF) Common Information Model (CIM)
 Meta-Object Facility, a meta-model used to formally define Unified Modeling Language (UML)
 Metal–organic framework, a chemical compound formed of metal ions and organic chemical components
 Midlothian Oat Flour, a brand of gruel; see Scott's Porage Oats
 Multiple organ failure, alternate term for Multiple organ dysfunction syndrome, a medical condition
 Microsoft Operations Framework, a set of operational guidelines based on ITIL
 Meilleur Ouvrier de France ("Best Worker of France"), a French competition for artisanal mastery
 Ministry of finance, a government department headed by a finance minister, responsible for tax collection and other money-related activities
 Mountain of Faith, the tenth game in the Touhou series of shoot 'em up games
 Monsters of Folk, an American folk group
 Mof, a Dutch slur referring to Germans
 MOF, IATA airport code for Frans Seda Airport, on the island of Flores in Indonesia
 Museum of Flight, air and space museum in Seattle, United States of America
 Madden Online Football, an online madden league created in 2003, United States of America.